is a volcanic, deserted island located in the Philippine Sea approximately  south of Tokyo and offshore Niijima, in the northern portion of the Izu archipelago, Japan.

Geography
The island is the only visible portion of a submarine volcanic caldera. The above sea-level portion rises to two summits connected by a narrow ridge, with the higher northern summit reaching . Located in the Kuroshio Current, the area has abundant sea life, and is popular with sports fishermen and scuba divers, with soft corals found in abundance off the east coast of the island.  Goats, deer and rabbits introduced to the island to provide food for the residents of Niijima from the 1930s have destroyed most of the natural vegetation of the island. Efforts to eradicate the introduced goats was successful by 1981, and deer by 1985.

See also

 Izu Islands
 Desert island
 List of islands

References

External links
Topographic Map

Izu Islands
Uninhabited islands of Japan
Extinct volcanoes
Islands of Tokyo